The 1974 Southern Conference men's basketball tournament took place from February 27–March 2, 1974, at the Richmond Coliseum in Richmond, Virginia. The Furman Paladins, led by head coach Joe Williams, won their third Southern Conference title and received the automatic berth to the 1974 NCAA tournament.

Format
All of the conference's eight members were eligible for the tournament. Teams were seeded based on conference winning percentage. The tournament used a preset bracket consisting of three rounds.

Bracket

* Overtime game

See also
List of Southern Conference men's basketball champions

References

Tournament
Southern Conference men's basketball tournament
Southern Conference men's basketball tournament
Southern Conference men's basketball tournament
Southern Conference men's basketball tournament